Count of San Esteban de Cañongo is a hereditary title in the Peerage of Spain, granted in 1816 by Ferdinand VII to Agustín José Ramón Valdés, colonel of the cavalry militias of Habana.

Counts of San Esteban de Cañongo (1816)

Agustín José Ramón Valdés y Pedroso, 1st Count of San Esteban de Cañongo
Agustín Martín Valdés y Aróstegui, 2nd Count of San Esteban de Cañongo
Manuel de Jesús de Peñalver y Valdés, 3rd Count of San Esteban de Cañongo
Francisco Valdés y Veliz, 4th Count of San Esteban de Cañongo
Luis de Pedroso y Madan, 5th Count of San Esteban de Cañongo
María Dolores de Pedroso y Sturdza, 6th Countess of San Esteban de Cañongo
Margarita de Pedroso y Sturdza, 7th Countess of San Esteban de Cañongo
Diego de Pedroso y Frost, 8th Count of San Esteban de Cañongo
María de la Luz de Pedroso y Fernández de Córdoba, 9th Countess of San Esteban de Cañongo

See also
Spain-Sweden relations

References

Counts of Spain
Lists of Spanish nobility
Noble titles created in 1910